The Canadian Independent Junior Hockey League (CIJHL) was a Canadian independent Junior A ice hockey league based in Lower Mainland of British Columbia.  The CIHL was a member of the United Hockey Union, a part of the Amateur Athletic Union.  None of the six teams announced to play in the CIJHL ever iced a team.

History
The CIJHL was announced in the Spring of 2014.  It announced 2 teams in Langley, and teams in Delta, Fleetwood, Pitt Meadows, and Surrey in the Lower Mainland of British Columbia.

In early July 2013, the CIJHL applied for entry into the United Hockey Union and sanctioning from the Amateur Athletic Union. One week after request the league was sanctioned by the AAU.  However, the league shut down on September 5, 2014 without playing a single game.

Announced teams for 2014-15

References

External links

Defunct ice hockey leagues in British Columbia
Defunct junior ice hockey leagues in Canada
Organizations based in British Columbia
Surrey, British Columbia
2013 establishments in British Columbia
2014 disestablishments in British Columbia
Sports leagues established in 2013
Sports leagues disestablished in 2014